Razdolny is a rural locality (a khutor) in Nikolskoye Rural Settlement, Bobrovsky District, Voronezh Oblast, Russia. The population was 71 as of 2010.

Geography 
Razdolny is located 23 km northwest of Bobrov (the district's administrative centre) by road. Nikolskoye 2-ye is the nearest rural locality.

References 

Rural localities in Bobrovsky District